S121 may refer to :
 HMS Artful (S121), a 2010 proposed Astute-class nuclear Fleet submarine of the Royal Navy
 S Pipinos (S 121), a Type 214 submarine